In materials science, a Lomer–Cottrell junction is a particular configuration of dislocations.

When two perfect dislocations encounter along a slip plane, each perfect dislocation can split into two Shockley partial dislocations: a leading dislocation and a trailing dislocation. When the two leading Shockley partials combine, they form a separate dislocation with a burgers vector that is not in the slip plane. This is the Lomer–Cottrell dislocation. It is sessile and immobile in the slip plane, acting as a barrier against other dislocations in the plane. The trailing dislocations pile up behind the Lomer–Cottrell dislocation, and an ever greater force is required to push additional dislocations into the pile-up.

ex. FCC lattice along {111} slip planes

              |leading| |trailing|

Combination of leading dislocations:

The resulting dislocation is along the crystal face, which is not a slip plane in FCC at room temperature.

Lomer–Cottrell dislocation

References

Crystallographic defects